Cheri Elliott (born April 17, 1970) is an American former champion female bicycle motocross (BMX) racer in the 1980s, and a champion Downhill and Slalom mountain bike racer in the 1990s and early 2000s. During her BMX career, she spent most of her racing career on the national circuit with the Skyway Recreation factory team. She had a relatively short BMX career, but she is a four-time national champion and four-time world champion, including three consecutive National Number One girl-racer titles for the American Bicycle Association (ABA) from 1983 through 1985. She also held the regional UBR Number one girl racer title in 1982. She was the first female racer inducted into the ABA BMX Hall of Fame in 1989, and the first female BMX racer inducted into the United States Bicycling Hall of Fame in 2008.

Biography
Elliott snow-skied when she was two years old.

Elliott's BMX career lasted from 1980 until 1986, and saw a brief comeback in 1989.

From an early age, she was not only dominant in the girls division of BMX (formerly called "Powder Puff"), but was also usually competitive with boys in her age group. An athletic strawberry blond with deep dimples when she smiled, Elliott was  approximately five feet tall in the seventh grade, making her somewhat larger than most of the boys in her class at Will Rodgers Intermediate Junior High School and the boys at the BMX track.

During her racing career—and while in the sixth grade of junior high school—Elliott was asked to play "first string"' on the varsity senior high school Basketball team. She helped that high school team win a championship. She continued pursuing other sports during her BMX career, and after leaving the sport in 1986.

Elliott was named Most Valuable Player in both basketball and volleyball during her senior year of high school.

She also played in her college freshman year at the University of the Pacific.

BMX racing career
When there weren't enough girls in her age group at a particular BMX race to form out a separate class, she often raced with them, winning "Motos" (the qualifying heats) and "Opens" (the class that was open to both male novices and experts, and where girls were free to race each other). She would frequently make the "Mains"—the race final that would decide the winner for the day—in the boys division. Even when there were enough girls to form a class, she still often participated with the boys in the United Bicycle Racers (UBR) "11 Expert" class, complaining that the girls were "too slow". At a 1981 UBR National held in Laguna Seca, California, she raced in the 14-and-over girls' competition, despite being only 11 years old at the time, "because the 12-to-13 is too easy".

UBR rules at the time stated that if a girl raced in the boys' expert classes, she could not race in the girls' class. As a result, she mostly raced in the boys' Expert and Open classes. She also frequently participated in, and sometimes won, the "Trophy Dash"—the final event of a race, in which the winners of two closely related age classes and the three skill classes participate in an exhibition race that has no effect on the rider's yearly ranking. Unlike the UBR and the National Bicycle League (NBL), the ABA did not allow girls to compete in the boys' Expert Class until 1984. The ABA did allow her to run in the Trophy Dash and 12-and-under Cruiser Class. She often won on the local level, occasionally beating the male Experts—the highest amateur class. In the 1982 ABA Grand National, she placed second in the Cruiser Class, beaten by only Danny Steplight. She also won a few Trophy Dash races on her 20-inch bike at the national level; she won the 11-12 Trophy Dash at the 1983 ABA Cajun Nationals in Shreveport, Louisiana in January 1983, overpowering 12 Expert winner Jason Griggs, who had dominated his age class throughout 1982 and 1983. She was, at the time, the only girl to win the Trophy Dash at an ABA national that anyone could recall.

Elliott excelled in Quarter Pipe BMX freestyle trick riding, which at the time was unusual for a girl. She was also one of the few girls at the time who could do a "Table Top", where the rider, after launching herself high into the air off a steep ramp or berm, lays the frame of her bike parallel with the ground and righting the bike again before landing.

Elliott's BMX career was relatively short, lasting only six years. Elliott retired from twenty-inch BMX racing early in the 1986 season, right after the ABA Supernationals (which were held on January 26 and 27). Explaining the reason for her decision, Elliott said "I did all I wanted to do. I wanted to quit last year, but I thought about getting ABA No. 1 two years in a row. And I did it—that was my goal."
(Elliot misspoke about-or BMX Action misprinted-the number of consecutive number-one plates she was going for. It was three years in a row, not two.) She also wanted to pursue and concentrate on scholastic sports, like basketball.

Elliott told BMX Plus!, in their June 1986 issue, that Skyway Recreations, the factory racing team that sponsored her, dropped their racing team after the 1985 racing season. The year 1986 was known to racers as "the year of no sponsorships" because some bicycle manufactures who sponsored racing teams, like Torker and JMC, went out of business—due, in part, to low cost Asian imports.  The teams sponsored by Diamond Back and Redline were pared back, and Skyway dropped their sponsorship altogether, in favor of either creating or expanding BMX Freestyle teams.

Elliott did race in one National in 1986: the ABA Supernationals in late January, where she placed fourth in the 15 & Over Girls class.
As the BMX periodical BMX Action put it, "after being casually released from Skyway, [she] decided it was easier to just quit the sport while on top than shop for a ride."
In 1996, she would co-author a book called The Athlete's Guide to Sponsorship during her subsequent mountain-bike racing career.

Women's professional BMX racing
The NBL introduced the girls' pro class in the 1985 season, and continued it through the 1987 season.  Elliott did not turn professional, because she retired at age 15 when the minimum required age to turn pro was 16. She did express interest in the pro class: "There needs to be a pro class for the girls so we will have more interest in the sport."

She was happy when the NBL's Competition Congress authorized a pro girls' class in late 1984: "I think it's great that they finally passed it... Now girls will have something to stay in the sport for." When the pro Girls' class started at the beginning of the 1985 season, only girls 16 years of age and older qualified to compete in it. Elliott was only 15 years old on April 17, 1985.

As Elliott put it during an interview conducted by her modern day counterpart, professional cyclist Jill Kintner, on Kintner's blog:

BMX retirement
After almost four years, Elliott came out of retirement on the national level on Saturday October 28, 1989, when she raced the ABA's Fall National in Yorba Linda, Californiaapparently for the fun of it due to her ABA BMX Hall of Fame induction the following November. She probably thought she would be at the ABA Grand Nationals anyway for her acceptance speech, why not race as well? Other reports have it that Elliott was lured out of retirement by the Bicycle Center bicycle shop as a "spoiler" to better position other Bicycle Center racers to take various titles. Whatever the reason, prior to the Fall Nationals she was seen practicing at the Roseville, California Oak Creek BMX track. She dominated the 15 & Over girls' class at the Fall Nationals on Saturday. However, she slipped her pedals in the Main and finished in seventh place—last, in this case—in the main. On Sunday, she again came in last (out of six) in the main.

Elliott was on the verge of winning her 15 & Over girls' Main at the 1989 ABA Grand Nationals in Oklahoma City, Oklahoma; however, fate bit her again as it did at the Fall Nationals. She fell doing a trick over a jump. She landed badly, and crashed. The rest of the pack passed her, and her chance of being the Grand National winner went with them. Mapuana Naki won the National number one girl title for 1989. Elliot was not in contention for the title, since she didn't resume racing until October 1989. After racing one or two more times on the national level, Elliott continued her BMX retirement in February 1990.

Professional mountain bike racing
Retiring from BMX did not cure her entirely of the racing bug.  After college and  a five-year retirement—nine years, if you do not count her two races in 1989— she went on to mountain bike racing (MTB) in 1994.

MTB, a sport similar to BMX that uses bicycles with 26-inch wheels similar to the "Cruiser class" bicycles in BMX circa 1980, has courses that are much longer and on steep, downhill slopes, with certain events—especially snow racing—resembling downhill skiing. Races could last up to 10 minutes (compared to BMX's 30 to 40 seconds), with speeds hitting  (compared to BMX's  for Experts and Professionals). In her first year of racing mountain bikes, Elliott became the National Dual Slalom Champion, the first such championship of many.

Over her cycling career, Elliott has won 14 major world and national titles, including four National Off Road Bicycle Association National Championships and two ESPN X Games gold medals. However, she did not race in the revived NBL "Supergirls" class, its professional girls' division, when it was recreated in 1997, dedicating her time to Dual Slalom and Downhill MTB.

As she was starting her MTB racing career, she obtained a Bachelor of Science degree in Business (with Honors), concentrated in Real Estate and Finance, in 1994.

Post cycling career
Elliott retired from competitive racing during the 2001 Mountain Bike season, becoming a Realtor in California; she bills herself as "The Broker on a Bike".
She is also a public speaker, a helmet-safety advocate for children, and co-owns and runs her own sports management company, JED Sports Management.

Burnout played a role in her decision to retire, along with the more pressing question of injury. 

A few years after she retired from Mountain Bike competition, she considered another comeback in BMX, despite her career-ending back injury.  She contemplated coming out of retirement for the 2008 Summer Olympics in Beijing, China, where BMX racing was making its Olympic debut:

She chose not return, for health reasons.

Career BMX milestones

Career BMX factory and major bicycle shop sponsorships

Note: This listing only denotes the racer's primary sponsors. At any given time a racer could have numerous ever changing co-sponsors. Primary sponsorships can be verified by BMX press coverage and sponsor's advertisements at the time in question. When possible exact dates are given.

Amateur
JR Racing: 1980-December 1981
Boss Racing Frames: January 1982-December 1982
Skyway Recreations: January 1, 1983 – December 31, 1985
Retired from BMX racing for approximately 3.5 years (Early 1986-Late 1989).
Bicycle Center USA (bike shop): October 1989-February 1990. This was a brief two-race comeback for BMX Hall of Fame Induction awarded at the ABA Grand Nationals in November 1989. She resumed her retirement in early 1990.

Professional
No Pro career

Career bicycle motocross titles

Note: Listed are District, State/Provincial/Department, Regional, National, and International titles in italics. "Defunct" refers to the fact of that sanctioning body in question no longer existing at the start of the racer's career or at that stage of his/her career. Depending on point totals of individual racers, winners of Grand Nationals do not necessarily win National titles.

Amateur
National Bicycle Association (NBA)
None
National Bicycle League (NBL)
1981 11-13 Powder Puff Knott's Berry Farm Grand Champion (NBL, United Bicycle Racers (UBR) & World Wide Bicycle Motocross Association (WWBMXA) sanctioned.)
1983 12-13 Girls Grandnational Champion
1984 14-15 Girls Grandnational Champion
1984 National No.1 14-15 Girl.
American Bicycle Association (ABA)
1982 11-12 Girls Northwest Gold Cup Champion
1982 11-12 Girls Grandnational Champion
1982 11-12 girls Jag World Champion (ABA sanctioned)
1983 13-14 Girls U.S. Gold Cup Champion.
1983 13-14 Girls Grandnational Champion
1984 13-14 Girls U.S. Gold Cup Champion.
1984 California District 11 (Cal-11) No.1 Girl.
1984 13-14 Girls International Super Bowl of BMX Class Champion.
1984 13-14 Grandnational Champion
1985 15 & Over Girls Grandnational Champion1985 15 & Over Girls National No.11983, 1984, 1985 National No.1 Girl.

United Bicycle Racers Association (UBR)
1981 12-13 Girls Grandnational Champion1982 National No.1 Girl.

International Bicycle Motocross Federation (IBMXF)
1983 12-13 Girls Murray World II Cup Champion
1985 15 Girls Murray World Cup IV Champion1985 14-15 Girls World ChampionOther titles
1983 12-13 Girls Jag World Super Bowl Champion (Non sanctioned)

Notable BMX accolades
Named the seventh of the 25 Hottest Amateurs in BMX racing by a 1984 survey conducted by BMX Plus!, from the opinions of four prominent figures in BMX: Two racers, Brent Patterson and Mike Poulson; and two team officials: Dr. Gary Scofield of GT and Howard Wharthon of Diamond Back.
She is the first girl to earn two overall national number-one girl titles consecutively (1983, 1984 ABA), and the only girl to do so three times consecutively (1983, 1984, 1985 ABA).
In 1989, she became the first woman to be inducted into ABA BMX Hall of Fame.
In 2008, she became the first BMX woman to be inducted into the United States Bicycling Hall of Fame.
In 1985, she became the only female ever put on BMX Actions official list of suggested racers to be selected for voting in the magazine's Number One Racer Award (NORA) Cup for best racer of the year.

Racing habits and traits
Elliott had the physical quirk of unconsciously bobbing her head up and down slightly when she raced.

Notable BMX injuries
Elliott is one of the few top BMX racers to escape serious injury during her BMX career, in contrast to her Mountain Bike racing career.

Post-BMX career
After her last BMX race in late 1989, which came after a four-year hiatus, she became a mountain bike racer in 1993.

Mountain Bike Racing Career MilestonesNote: Professional first are on the national level unless otherwise indicated.

Career MTB titlesNote: Listed are Regional, National and International titles.

Amateur
No amateur status.

ProfessionalNational Off Road Bicycle Association (NORBA)1994 & 1995 National Dual Slalom Champion.
1997 National Downhill Champion.
1998 National Dual Slalom Champion.
2000 United States Dual Slalom ChampionESPN X-Games1995 Women's Summer Speed Downhill Gold Medalist.1995 Women's Summer Dual Downhill Gold Medalist.1997 Women's Winter Speed Downhill Gold Medalist.Union Cycliste Internationale (UCI)1998 Women's Downhill World Champion Bronze Medalist

Notable MTB accolades
During the 1997 and 1998 seasons, Ms. Elliott won the Guinness World Record for most X-Games Medals attained in Mountain Biking.

Notable MTB injuries

1994 Broken Right Thumb
1995 Received two concussions
1996 Right Shoulder AC Separation
1997 Broken Right Elbow
1999 Finger injury
2000-2001 Spinal Cord Annular Tear and Retrolisthesis L5-S1 (forced retirement) This was the instance in which she broke her back at event at Mammoth, California in 2001. She walked away from the crash but started having partial paralysis in her leg a few days later. 

Notes

References

Further reading

BMX, mountain bike magazine and general media interviews and articles

"Cheri Elliott" side bar BMX Plus! June 1982 Vol. 5 No. 6 pg. 77
"The Unquestioned Best!" Super BMX March 1984 Vol. 11 No. 3 pg. 73. One of the four ABA No.1 title holders of 1983 profiled.
"Cheri Elliott: The fastest girl in BMX" BMX Plus! May 1984 Vol.7 No.5 pg.35
"Super Cheri" Bicycles and Dirt September 1984 Vol. 10 No. 2 pg. 25
"Flashdance on Wheels" Women's Sport & Fitness October 1986  pg. 18
"Dusting Off the Competition" The Sacramento Bee January 24, 1985 Vol. 4 No. 55 (Neighbors)
"All The Best!" Super BMX & Freestyle March 1985 Vol. 12 No. 3 pg. 60 Cheri Elliott profiled along with the other three ABA no. 1 plate winners of 1984.
"BMX Girl Posts Easiest Win" Sacramento Sports Magazine March/April 1985 (SSM Sports Challenge)
"BMX's Newest Champions" Super BMX & Freestyle March 1986 Vol. 13 No. 3 pg. 58 Subject of one of four combined articles of the four 1985 ABA National No.1 Champions including Ronnie Anderson, Sean Callihan and Brent Romero.
"Cheri Elliott: Women's Dual Slalom Champion" Mountain Bike Action December 1994 pg. 100 (champions)
"How to Get Sponsored: Tips from Cheri Elliott" Mountain Bike Action June 1996 pg. 61 (Guide to Racing)
"Who's Who in the American Racing Scene" Mountain Bike Action December 1997 pg. 105
"Two Privateers Smoke the Factory Stars" Mountain Bike Action December 1997 pg. 130
"Cheri Elliott Saves American Face" Mountain Bike Action January 1999 pg. 115 (winners)

BMX and MTB magazine coversMinicycle/BMX Action & Super BMX:Super BMX: Spring 1985 American Bicycle Association (ABA) Grand National Special Edition at the far left insert. In middle insert Brent Romero. In the far right insert Pete Loncarevich. In the top insert Shawn Callihan.
Super BMX: March 1984 Vol. 11 No. 3 in insert with fellow amateur racers Doug Davis, Brett Allen and pro Brian Patterson as the 1983 ABA National Number Ones. Brian Patterson in main image.Bicycles and Dirt:September 1984 Vol.2 No.10 with Gary Ellis and Brit Audeoud in separate frames.ABA Action, American BMXer, BMXer (The official ABA membership publication under three names):
April 1984 Vol.7 No.3 far left with (clockwise) Eddy King, Brent Romero, Todd Guss, Brian Patterson, Doug Davis and Brett Allen.Mountain Biking:July 1995 Vol. 9 No. 7NORBA News:January 1995 Vol. 12 No .1Bike Racing Nation: (Official Publication of USA Cycling)'''
November/December 1998 Vol. 20 No. 2

External links
 A photo montage of Ms. Elliott during her BMX career.
 A site dedicated to her old BMX factory team circa early & mid-1980s.
 A history of Skyway Recreation.
 Photo of her in action during her Mountain Bike Racing career.
 Historical Cheri Elliott page with MTB and BMX photos.
 United States Bicycling Hall of Fame 2008 Inductee
 Cheri Elliott's current Website
 

1970 births
Living people
American female cyclists
BMX riders
American mountain bikers
People from Citrus Heights, California
21st-century American women